Dust of Life is a 1995 French drama film directed by Rachid Bouchareb. It was nominated for the Academy Award for Best Foreign Language Film as an Algerian submission. The film is based on a true story, originally recounted in a novel by Duyen Anh.

Plot
The film takes place after the end of Vietnam War. It tells the story of a Vietnamese boy, Son, born to a Vietnamese mother, and an African-American father who was fighting in the war but has since returned home to the USA. (The title 'Dust of Life' refers to the Vietnamese word for children of such mixed Amerasian parentage.) Son is taken away from his mother and confined to a labour camp, where life is harsh and chances of release slim. Together with some other boys from the camp, Son attempts to escape.

Cast
 Daniel Guyant — Son
 Gilles Chitlaphone — Bob
 Jehan Pagès — Petit Haï
 Éric Nguyen — Un-Deux
 Leon Outtrabady — Shrimp
 Lina Chua — Son's mother
 R. Shukor Kader — Son's father

Accolades
Academy Award
1996: Nominated, "Best Foreign Language Film"

Young Artist Award
1995: Won, "Outstanding Youth Actor in a Foreign Film" - Daniel Guyant & Jehan Pagès

See also
 List of submissions to the 68th Academy Awards for Best Foreign Language Film
 List of Algerian submissions for the Academy Award for Best Foreign Language Film

References

External links

 

1995 drama films
1995 films
German drama films
Belgian drama films
Hong Kong drama films
Algerian drama films
Films directed by Rachid Bouchareb
French drama films
1990s French-language films
1990s French films
1990s German films
1990s Hong Kong films